José Antonio Fortea Cucurull (born in Barbastro, Spain, October 11, 1968) also known as Father Fortea is a Spanish writer, and a Roman Catholic priest of the diocese of Alcalá de Henares (Madrid). He was appointed an exorcist in the past, but is no longer in office.

Life
His father was a businessman and did not expect him to become a priest, but to take charge of the family business since he was his only son. Father Fortea acknowledges that up until his adolescence, religion lacked importance for him and that the concept of sin seemed to be an anachronism. He valued the Church on the same level of Greek Mythology. During that period of time, he had in mind to pursue studies in Law School. However, when he turned 15 years old, his perspective had a radical change and, in his own words, he understood that “he was a sinner and that the Church was the truth.” He attributed this change to a grace from God. The same year, he finds himself considering the possibility of becoming a priest. After looking for guidance into this new path, he took the advice of a priest who told him to join the seminary, just to rule out any doubt. Upon entering the seminary, he clearly understood that the priesthood was his calling.

He then got a bachelor's degree in Theology at the University of Navarra and his master's degree in the University of Comillas. Even though his specialty in Theology was on History of the Church, his licentiate thesis was about the topic of exorcism, hence the title “Exorcism in the Present Age.” The result of those investigations was published under the titled “Daemoniacum.” That publication made him known for the first time in Spain.
Years later, and with a greater scope of knowledge in the topic, Summa Daemoniaca was published. This book was followed by a supplemental publication called Exorcística which provides new theoretical resources and practical cases.

Publications
Father Fortea’s most famous publication is Summa Daemoniaca. That book is a treatise of demonology and an exorcist’s manual. The book analyzes the world of demons, the final damnation state of the soul, the inter-relationship of the fallen angels among themselves and with respect to angels, human beings and God. The book’s second part deals with the different related demonic phenomena: how to discern if someone’s possessed, how to conduct an exorcism, the poltergeist phenomenon in haunted houses, as well as some other strange and unusual phenomena. That book ends with an analysis about evil itself. The “reflections” at the end of the book constitute the most philosophical part of the treaty.

The book Exorcistica is a supplemental publication of Summa Daemoniaca. It is as extensive as the book it supplements: this second treaty embraces with a deeper understanding the topics discussed in the first book. The book, Anneliese Michelle, a Case of Possession, analyzes the case of a possessed German girl who died in 1976. In A Mysterious God, the question about charismatic gifts is analyzed as well.

Fr. Fortea has been prolific in regards to exploring the literature field. In fact, he wrote a novel series regarding the book of Apocalipse called “Decalogia or Saga of Apocalipse” which is a cycle of ten novels about the end of the world, explained over and over again from a series of different perspectives.
The following is a complete list of his publications classified by genres:
Decalogia or Saga of the Apocalipse:
Ciclus Apocalypticus (2005) 
Historia de la II Secesión de los Estados Unidos de América (2005) 
La Construcción del Jardín del Edén (2005) 
Memoirs of the Last Templar Master: Anno Domini 2211 (2005) 
The Judgement (2005) 
Necronerópolis (2005) 
Línea Trocaica (2005) 
Goedia (2005) 
Book Nine: Abstracts from the Revelation Era (2005) 
Book Ten: Abstracts from the Revelation Era (2005) 
Edipo Vasco - Libros Libres, 2004.  
Obra Férrea - Editorial Dos Latidos, Benasque 2004, 

Dogmatic Theology
Daemoniacum: a Demonology Treaty - Belacqua, Barcelona 2002  
Summa Daemoniaca - Dos Latidos, S.L.U, 2004   
Exorcística. 2007. 
Anneliese Michelle, a Case of Possession - Editorial Polwen. Polonia, 2011. 
A Mysterious God - Editorial Dos Latidos. Benasque 2010.

Other Works
Eimeric, Nicolau: Manual de Inquisidores - La Esfera de los Libros S.L. Traducción y prólogo de J.A. Fortea. 
Memoirs of an Exorcist - Editorial Martínez Roca. 2008.

Novel 
 Decalogía o Saga del Apocalipsis:
 Cyclus Apocalypticus (2005)
 Historia de la segunda secesión de los Estados Unidos (2005)
 La construcción del Jardín del Edén (2005)
 Memorias del último gran maestre templario. Año del señor 2211 (2005)
 El juicio (2005)
 Necronerópolis (2005)
 Línea trocaica (2005)
 Goedia (2005)
 Libro noveno. Fragmentos de la época del Apocalipsis (2005)
 Libro décimo. Fragmentos de la época del Apocalipsis (2005)
 Edipo Vasco, Libros Libres, 2004. 
 Obra Férrea Editorial Dos Latidos, Benasque 2004,

Dogmatic Theology 
 Daemoniacum. Tratado de demonología. Belacqua, Barcelona 2002 
 Summa Daemoniaca. Dos Latidos, S.L.U, 2004  
 Exorcística. Cuestiones sobre el demonio, la posesión y el exorcismo, 2007.
 Anneliese Michelle, un caso de posesión, Editorial Polwen. Polonia, 2011.
 Un Dios Misterioso, Editorial Dos Latidos. Benasque 2010.

Other works 
 Eimeric, Nicolau: Manual de Inquisidores La Esfera de los Libros S.L. Traducción y prólogo de J.A. Fortea.
 Memorias de un Exorcista, Editorial Martínez Roca. 2008.

References

External links 

Specialized Catholic web about Possession and Exorcism. Spain Exorcist Father Jose Antonio Fortea
Contact Information & Website, Jose Antonio Fortea
Jose Antonio Fortea Cucurull Facebook 
Blog Del Padre Fortea
 Exorcist on Satan Not Having Last Word, Interview with Father José Antonio Fortea, May 11, 2005, Zenit News Agency.
 Exorcism Makes a Believer of a Journalist, Oct. 6, 2002, Zenit News Agency.
 Book by Spanish exorcist outsells Da Vinci Code in Paraguay, Jun 19, 2006, Catholic News Agency.

Catholic theology and doctrine
Demonologists
Catholic exorcists
Living people
1968 births
University of Navarra alumni
Spanish exorcists